Kragić or Kragic is a surname. Notable people with the surname include:

Vladimir Kragić (1910–1975), Croatian footballer
Danica Kragic (born  1971), Swedish engineer